The Abashidze is a Georgian family and a former princely house. Appearing in the 15th century, they achieved prominence in the Kingdom of Imereti in western Georgia in the late 17th century and branched out in the eastern Georgian kingdoms of Kakheti and Kartli as well as the then-Ottoman-held southwestern region of Adjara. After the Russian annexation of Georgian polities, the family was confirmed as Knyaz Abashidze by the Tsar’s decree of 1825.

History 

The Abashidze family possibly derived from the medieval Georgian noble house of Liparitid-Orbeliani, but the family legend holds that it descended from an Abyssinian officer named Abash who had allegedly accompanied Marwan ibn Muhammad’s Arab army to Georgia in the 8th century; Abash is said to have remained in Georgia and ennobled when he saved the life of a Georgian crown prince from a wolf.

The first recorded account about the Abashidze dates back to the latter part of the 15th century. By the 1540s, they had already been in possession of a sizeable fiefdom within the Kingdom of Imereti located in its eastern part and called Saabashidzeo (სააბაშიძეო; literally, "[the land] of Abashidze"). The family reached a climax of its might at the turn of the 18th century, when it possessed 78 villages, several castles, fortresses, churches and monasteries as well as 1,500 serf households. Prince Giorgi-Malakia Abashidze was not only the most powerful vassal of the crown of Imereti, but himself acted as a kingmaker and even de facto king from 1702 to 1707. The family branched out in eastern Georgia when Erekle II, King of Kartli and Kakheti, granted, in 1774, to his father-in-law Prince Zaal Abashidze and his male descendants estates in Kakheti. A branch had also been established in Kartli in the person of Vakhushti Abashidze. Earlier in the 18th century, one representative of the Imeretian line went over to the Ottoman government and settled at Batumi where his descendants attained to the office of sanjak-bey.

The Russian annexation of Imereti in 1810 brought the princedom of Saabashidzeo to an end. Henceforth, the family was equated to other noble families of the Russian Empire and confirmed as princes on September 20, 1825. On July 29, 1876, Prince Simon Abashidze (1837–1891) was granted the right to assume the surname and coat of arms of his father-in-law, the late Ukrainian nobleman Semen Davydovych Gorlenko, for himself and his male-line descendants (Abashidze-Gorlenko, Абашидзе-Горленко), but he died without a male heir.

The family has survived into the 21st century and has produced several notable writers, public figures and politicians.

See also
Abashidze (surname)
List of Georgian princely families

References 

 Абашидзе. In: Холюшкин Юрий Павлович. Титулованные Роды Российской империи. Accessed on September 3, 2007.

Noble families of Georgia (country)
Families of Georgia (country)
Russian noble families
Georgian-language surnames
History of Adjara